Nörtershausen is a municipality in the district of Mayen-Koblenz in Rhineland-Palatinate, western Germany.

References

Mayen-Koblenz